Alexander Williams may refer to:

Alexander Williams (artist) (1846–1930), Irish painter
Alexander Williams (cartoonist) (born 1967), animator and cartoonist
Alexander S. Williams (1839–1917), NYPD police inspector
Alexander Williams Jr. (born 1948), U.S. federal judge
Alexander B. Williams (1815–?), American merchant and politician from New York
Edward Alexander Wilmot Williams (1910–1994), British Army general

See also
Sandy Williams (Alexander Balos Williams, 1906–1991), American trombonist
Alex Williams (disambiguation)
Al Williams (disambiguation)
Alexander (disambiguation)
Williams (disambiguation)
William Alexander (disambiguation)